Adava is a small village in Gajapati District, Odisha, India. The total population of the village is 3,470 among which the total male population is 1,782 and total female population is 1,688.

References 

Villages in Gajapati district